This list of Dartmouth College faculty includes notable current and former instructors and administrators of Dartmouth College, an Ivy League university located in Hanover, New Hampshire, United States. It includes faculty at its related graduate schools and programs, including the Tuck School of Business, the Thayer School of Engineering, and Geisel School of Medicine. , Dartmouth employs 597 tenured or tenure-track faculty members, 366 of whom are in the undergraduate Arts & Sciences division. More than 90% of the faculty hold a doctorate or equivalent degree.

Dartmouth faculty were at the forefront of such major academic developments as the Dartmouth Conferences, the Dartmouth Time Sharing System, Dartmouth BASIC, and Dartmouth ALGOL 30. , sponsored project awards to Dartmouth faculty research amounted to $169 million.

This list also includes the "Wheelock Succession", the eighteen men who have served as president of Dartmouth College. Active faculty members are highlighted in green.

Faculty of Arts & Sciences 
In this section, faculty are categorized by their primary department's academic division, as defined by the dean of the faculty. Former faculty who taught in now-defunct departments or subject areas are grouped in the most appropriate division, or in the "Other" section.

Arts and humanities

Interdisciplinary studies

Sciences

Social sciences

Other

Geisel School of Medicine

Thayer School of Engineering

Tuck School of Business

Wheelock Succession of Dartmouth Presidents

Notes 

The dean of the faculty currently identifies four academic divisions as follows:
Arts & Humanities Division: Art History, Asian and Middle Eastern Languages and Literatures, Classics, English, Film and Television Studies, French and Italian, German Studies, Music, Philosophy, Religion, Russian, Spanish and Portuguese, Studio Art, Theater.
Interdisciplinary Studies Division: African and African American Studies, Asian and Middle-Eastern Studies, Comparative Literature, Environmental Studies, Jewish Studies, Latin American, Latino and Caribbean Studies, Linguistics & Cognitive Sciences, Mathematics and Social Sciences, Native American Studies, Women's and Gender Studies, Writing Program.
Sciences Division: Biological Sciences, Chemistry, Computer Sciences, Earth Sciences, Engineering Sciences, Environmental Studies Program, Mathematics, Physics & Astronomy.
Social Sciences Division: Anthropology, Asian and Middle Eastern Studies, Economics, Education, Geography, Government, History, Latin American, Latino, and Caribbean Studies, Mathematics and Social Sciences, Native American Studies, Psychological and Brain Sciences, Sociology.

See also 

 Board of Trustees of Dartmouth College
 List of Dartmouth College alumni

References

External links 
 Dartmouth Faculty Directory
 Dean of the Faculty
 Guide to Dartmouth Experts at Dartmouth News

Lists of people by university or college in New Hampshire